Brian Burrows (born February 17, 1988, in Torrance, California) is an American sport shooter. Burrows and Madelynn Bernau won the bronze medal in the mixed trap team event at the 2020 Summer Olympics held in Tokyo, Japan.

In 2019, he won the gold medal in the men's trap event at the 2019 Pan American Games held in Lima, Peru. He also won the silver medal in the mixed trap event together with Rachel Tozier.

In 2021, he represented the United States at the 2020 Summer Olympics in Tokyo, Japan.

References

External links 
 

Living people
1988 births
American male sport shooters
Trap and double trap shooters
Pan American Games medalists in shooting
Pan American Games gold medalists for the United States
Shooters at the 2019 Pan American Games
Medalists at the 2019 Pan American Games
Sportspeople from Torrance, California
Olympic shooters of the United States
Shooters at the 2020 Summer Olympics
Medalists at the 2020 Summer Olympics
Olympic medalists in shooting
Olympic bronze medalists for the United States in shooting
20th-century American people
21st-century American people